The Oldsmobile Recon was a 1999 concept car built by Oldsmobile. It was a  compact crossover SUV that featured 5 doors, 5 seats, a dual panel panoramic sunroof and rear suicide doors. Another unique feature was a reconfigurable instrument panel. The Recon was all-wheel-drive. It also featured a 3.0L V6 engine. The Recon never became a production model; the most likely reason is Oldsmobile's discontinuation in 2004. However, GM's first true compact SUV, the 2002 Saturn Vue does bear a slight resemblance to the Recon.

References

Recon
All-wheel-drive vehicles
Compact sport utility vehicles
Crossover sport utility vehicles